Sunny Side of the Street is a 1951 American comedy film directed by Richard Quine and starring Frankie Laine and Billy Daniels.

Plot summary

Betty Holloway (Terry Moore) a receptionist at a major TV station hopes to secure a break for her singer boyfriend Ted Mason (Jerome Courtland), Betty enlists the aid of Laine. Mason's career really takes off when a team of TV writers discover that he's the childhood sweetheart of Gloria Pelly (Audrey Long), the daughter of an important sponsor.

Cast
 Frankie Laine as himself
 Billy Daniels as himself
 Terry Moore as Betty Holloway
 Jerome Courtland as Ted Mason
 Toni Arden as herself
 Lynn Bari as Mary
 Audrey Long as Gloria Pelley
 Dick Wesson as Dave Gibson
 William Tracy as Al Little
 Willard Waterman as John 'J.R.' Stevens
 Jonathan Hale as Cyrus Pelley
 Amanda Blake as Susie Manning
 Benny Payne as Benny

References

External links
 
 
 
 

1951 films
1951 musical comedy films
Films directed by Richard Quine
Cinecolor films
Columbia Pictures films
1951 romantic comedy films
American musical comedy films
American romantic comedy films
American romantic musical films
1950s English-language films
1950s romantic musical films
1950s American films